Monosyntaxis ochrosphena is a moth of the family Erebidae. It was described by Wileman and West in 1928. It is found on Luzon in the Philippines.

References

Lithosiina
Moths described in 1928